Massimo N'Cede Goh (born 1 February 1999) is an Italian footballer who plays as a attacker.

Career

Goh started his career with Italian Serie A side Juventus. In 2017, he was sent on loan to Virtus Verona in the Italian fourth division. In 2018, Goh was sent on loan to Ukrainian club Arsenal-Kyiv. Before the second half of 2018-19, he returned to Virtus Verona in the Italian third division, where he made 4 league appearances and scored 0 goals. On 12 February 2019, Goh debuted for Virtus Verona during a 0-1 loss to Renate. Before the second half of 2019-20, he signed for Italian fourth division team Crema. In 2021, he signed for CSC 1599 Șelimbăr in Romania.

Personal life

Goh is the cousin of Italy international Moise Kean.

References

External links
 
 

Italian footballers
Association football forwards
Living people
Expatriate footballers in Romania
1999 births
Expatriate footballers in Ukraine
Italian people of Ivorian descent
Virtus Verona players
Cavese 1919 players
Liga II players
CSC 1599 Șelimbăr players
Italian expatriate sportspeople in Romania